Hello Missfortune (lit. Falling In Love With My Bad Luck) is a Hong Kong television series created and produced by television network TVB. With Dave Fong as the executive producer, it premiered on 27 December, 2021 and continued until 7 January, 2022 for 10 Episodes. Starring Hubert Wu and Erica Chan, the show incorporates fantasy and afterlife aspects depicting beings who belong to different world dimensions and their learning experience of letting go of unresolved conflicts of the past.

Cast

 Hubert Wu as Chan Pei-ho: a timid food delivery man who lives and takes care of his grandmother Dave Fong indicated that the character is not meant to be a hero; instead, he is a representation of cowardice and fearful people living in society.
 Fung Ho-yeung as teenage Pei-ho
 Erica Chan as Poon Siu-yu: a novice destiny administrator at the Life Administration Agency who is tasked with managing luck or misfortune in the human world
 Stephanie "Miumiu" Au as the teenage Siu-yu
 Lee Tsz-yan as the childhood Siu-yu
 Mark Ma as Santino Pong Yiu-tin: a colleague of Siu-yu at the Life Administration Agency
 Mayanne Mak as Pau Sau-yuk: a colleague of Siu-yu at the Life Administration Agency
 Timothy Cheng as Szema Kwan-leun: the supervisor at the Life Administration Agency  
 Law Lan as Lam Sze-mei: Chan Pei-ho's grandmother
 Lincoln Hui as Alvin Tau Jit-yan: an artist and Siu-yu's ex-boyfriend
 Vivian Koo as Kam-yan: a visual arts university student and Alvin's current girlfriend
 Eddie Li as Chan Chuen: Pei-ho's father who is alienated from home due to his gambling debt
 June Ng as Chan Lai-chi: Pei-ho's older sister who is married and works in the financial industry
 Susan Tse as Bong Yeung Ka-sin: Santino's living mother
 Chiu Lok-yin as Poon Hou-yin: Siu-yu's deceased father
 Doris Chow as Ng Wai-yi: Siu-yu's deceased mother

Synopsis

When a person dies, they are either taken to many layers of Heaven or reincarnated. The deceased Poon Siu-yu died seven years ago at the age of 17 in the first dimension, "Human World". She entered the second dimension and joined the Life Administration Agency, becoming a novice destiny administrator. She is tasked to give out a certain amount of misfortune to Chan Pei-ho, a food delivery worker in the human world. Despite the rain and sunshine, Pei-ho works daily, earning just a little income, with his family paying little attention to him. The stumbling blocks in life make Pei-ho difficult to breathe. Moreover, he has to endure the obstacles Siu-yu causes him at work. Finding empathy for her client, Siu Yu is reluctant to fulfill her task and finds herself helping him. Pei-ho gradually discovers that this mysterious girl is not an ordinary being. As the story unfolds, Siu-yu recalls the reason for her death and how she was mercilessly killed, in which Pei-ho was indirectly involved, realizing there is a deliberate link that dragged them back together. The two, despite everything, develop a love story that most likely wouldn't work out.

Production and background

Executive produced by Dave Fong, the central theme of Hello Missfortune talks about how one can make wrong decisions when facing different opportunities in life. When that happens, they need to endure loss and learn how to redeem themselves. The series featured Erica Chan in her first leading role. Fong was deeply impressed with Chan's professionalism and learning motivation during her previous cameo roles and decided to cast her as the female lead, feeling she has the "right temperament" for the character. Chan deliberately took an acting course before filming to be fully prepared. Singer-songwriter Vivian Koo also made her acting debut appearing in a supporting role. She was "moved" by the storyline, which inspired her to co-write a song, "With You", for the soundtrack. Principal photography took place approximately from April to June 2021. A few details in the storyline made references to the classic film Days of Being Wild (1990) and TVB series, including Gods of Honour (2001) and When Heaven Burns (2004).

Music

Reception and ratings

Hello Missfortune received a favorable response from the audience, being noted for the depth of its storyline and freshness in casting. Lam Seun-ging from HK01 wrote the show was able to "explain complex truths in a simple way", which can "impact the soul and make people reflect". Lam Wai-san from Sky Post expressed that the plot brought out "different touching stories" while Sam Ngou-ming from Ming Pao Weekly highlighted Erica Chan's "natural acting" as the "biggest surprise" of the series.

Notes

References

External links
 

2021 Hong Kong television series debuts
Hong Kong drama television series
Hong Kong romance television series
TVB dramas
TVB original programming